Bănia is a commune in Caraș-Severin County, western Romania, with a population of 2,014 people. It is composed of two villages, Bănia and Gârbovăț (Gerbóc).

Natives
Păun Otiman

References

Communes in Caraș-Severin County
Localities in Romanian Banat